The tooth-billed pigeons are the only genus (Didunculus) of the subfamily Didunculinae, in the pigeon and dove family, (Columbidae). It has no close living relatives, but it has been shown to be genetically close to the dodo, and the genus name Didunculus means "little dodo". The jaw and tongue structure, and the superficially parrotlike bill have suggested a relationship to the parrots, but these features have arisen from its specialised diet rather than any real relationship.

Species
Two species are known:
 †Didunculus placopedetes, Tongan tooth-billed pigeon 
 Didunculus strigirostris, Tooth-billed pigeon 

The Tongan tooth-billed pigeon (Didunculus placopedetes bebefolis) is only known from subfossil remains in several archaeological sites in Tonga dating 2700–2850 BP and now extinct. The tooth-billed pigeon (Didunculus strigirostris) from Samoa is critically endangered.

Notes

References

 
Taxa named by Sir William Jardine
Bird genera
Bird genera with one living species